Lee Je-seung (born July 21, 1994) is a South Korean football player. He played for Montedio Yamagata.

Career
Lee Je-seung joined J2 League club Montedio Yamagata in 2016.

References

External links

1994 births
Living people
South Korean footballers
J2 League players
Montedio Yamagata players
Association football defenders